Hernst Bellevue Jr. (born March 12, 1974; better known by his stage name Krunk-a-Delic) is an American songwriter, hip hop, R&B, pop music and record producer. Krunk-a-Delic has written and produced gold and platinum records such as Jamie Foxx's "I Don't Know," Ludacris feat. Dtp's "Dtp For Life," (from Disturbing tha Peace) and Ms. Dynamite's "Afraid to Fly" (from A Little Deeper).  He is a key collaborator on the production of  Sean Paul's triple platinum Billboard Hot 100 #1 hit "Temperature." He is also a contributor to Nelly Furtado's Latin Grammy winning and platinum album "Mi Plan." Krunk-a-Delic has written and produced records for Nelly Furtado, N-Dubz, Nina Sky, Lil' Flip, Noel Gourdin, Starboy Nathan, Shawnna, Jimmy Cozier, Alison Hinds, Jazmine Sullivan, I 20, Cory Lee, Chris Webby, City Girls, Lunchmoney Lewis, as well songs recorded by Nas, Mary J. Blige, Jennifer Hudson, Ciara, Rick Ross, and more. In the past, he was known to frequently collaborate with producer Salaam Remi.

Discography

References

External links
 
 Discogs.com
 Albumcredits.com
 Allmusic.com

Further reading
 

1974 births
Living people
American male songwriters
American record producers